Lieutenant General Mika Peltonen was the Chief of Operations in the Finnish Defense Forces.

General Peltonen was born on 23 January 1956 in Tampere, Finland.  He was a foreign exchange student taking part in the Youth For Understanding exchange program.  He lived in Glendale, California where he attended and graduated from Herbert Hoover High School.  He graduated from high school in Finland in 1976 and the Finnish Military Academy in 1980.

General Peltonen has had an illustrious career in the Finnish Military. He has served as Aide-de-Camp to three successive Finnish Presidents, taught at the Finnish Military Academy, been Commander of the Multinational Task Force North of EUFOR in 2005,  had command of an infantry brigade, Inspector on Finnish Infantry, Finnish Defense forces Chief of Planning and is currently serving as Chief of Operations.

References

Bibliography

Primary sources
Aides-de-Camp until 1.3.2000 Web page - http://www.tpk.fi/ahtisaari/eng/cven.html
Hoover High School "Scroll" yearbook, 1974 - page 37
News article documenting EUFOR's Multinational Task Force North's handover from General Peltonen: http://www.setimes.com/cocoon/setimes/mobile/bs/features/setimes/newsbriefs/2005/12/01/nb-02
News article showing rank as Major General and Chief of Planning: http://www.fincent.fi/html/en/1256738635045486679.html
Article showing 2011 current position as Deputy Chief of staff: https://web.archive.org/web/20150213043358/http://www.puolustusvoimat.fi/wcm/Erikoissivustot/pvsh11/English/Commanders+words/

1956 births
Living people
Finnish military personnel
Finnish soldiers
People from Glendale, California